Anthony Quinn (born 30 November 1949) is an Irish boxer. He competed in the men's lightweight event at the 1968 Summer Olympics.

References

External links
 

1949 births
Living people
Irish male boxers
Olympic boxers of Ireland
Boxers at the 1968 Summer Olympics
Sportspeople from Newry
Lightweight boxers